Michael Evans (born July 21, 1976) is a Dutch former professional footballer.

Club career
He made his professional debut for VVV-Venlo in an August 1995 Eerste Divisie match against RBC and after six seasons with his hometown club Evans tried out for Bradford City for three weeks, after which he had a trial at York City early in the 2001–02 season. He was signed by York initially on a one-month contract. He returned to Holland to play 7 seasons in the Dutch Hoofdklasse.

Evans was born in the Netherlands with an American father. He was released by JVC Cuijk in summer 2009 and joined fellow amateurs Rood Wit Groesbeek.

References

External links
Michael Evans at Voetbal International
 Profile and stats - VVV-Venlo

1976 births
Living people
Footballers from Venlo
Dutch footballers
Association football forwards
VVV-Venlo players
York City F.C. players
De Treffers players
JVC Cuijk players
Eerste Divisie players
English Football League players
Dutch expatriate footballers
Expatriate footballers in England
Dutch expatriate sportspeople in England
Dutch people of American descent